The climate of Allentown, Pennsylvania is classified as a humid continental climate (Köppen Dfa).

Allentown occasionally has some severe weather, mostly thunderstorms and flooding.  Winters can bring snow, with some years receiving very little of it while others seeing several major snowstorms (often Nor'easters).  Winter also brings the more dangerous ice, sleet, and freezing rain, which has caused several traffic accidents over the years.  Tropical storms and hurricanes occasionally survive up the coast of the Atlantic Ocean and cross into Pennsylvania. Storms such as Hurricane Ivan and more recently Hurricane Sandy have caused light to severe damage in the area.

Average temperatures

Extremes

Allentown began maintaining weather records in 1922. Records from 1922 to date include:

Temperature
Highest recorded temperature:  on July 3, 1966
Lowest daily maximum temperature:  on January 19, 1994
Highest daily minimum temperature:  on July 15, 1995
Lowest recorded temperature:  on January 21, 1994
Highest daily average temperature:  on July 22, 2011
Lowest daily average temperature:  on January 19, 1994

Precipitation and snow
Most precipitation in 24 hours:  October 8, 2005
Heaviest 24-hour snowfall:  on February 11, 1983
Greatest daily snow depth:  on February 12, 1983

Summer
Summers in Eastern Pennsylvania are hot and very humid, with temperatures in the mid-80s and low-90s. Humidity is often around 80 percent, which is a drastic change for someone living in the Southwest United States. Rain is common, and is often accompanied by strong or severe thunderstorms. These will cause quite a large amount of rain, but they do not last long at all. Air conditioning is popular among most households in the summer months, because high temperatures and high humidity can make the air feel much warmer than the actual temperature.

Autumn
Autumn is fairly mild, with daytime temperatures in the 70s and 60s.  Autumn brings more wind, and sometimes heavier rainfall.  Trees begin to lose their leaves before the cold winter season. Indian summer may occur.

Winter

Snowfall is common, with amounts varying greatly between seasons. Snow, ice, sleet, and freezing rain can cause road problems and school closures. In February 2007, Interstate Highway 78 was closed just west of the city. Drivers were stranded on the stretch of highway for as much as 24 hours, with overturned tractor trailers blocking the way. Winter sports are popular, such as snowboarding and skiing, and they can be enjoyed in the Pocono Mountains, just north of the Lehigh Valley.

Spring
Spring is a season of growth, with new grass growing and flowers blooming.  Animals come out of hibernation, and sun fills the city and its surroundings.  Temperatures are on the rise, but March and April bring much rain, with light rain that can last for hours on end.  That gives way to warm May and June months, and shore weather is in the forecast for many residents.

Natural disasters

Hurricanes, tropical storms, and Tropical Depressions are all summer threats.  Severe thunderstorms are an even bigger threat, and can cause flash flooding.  When flash flooding occurs, mudslides are rare but are possible. Tornadoes and earthquakes are not common, but they have been reported.  Blizzards have happened, but usually once every ten or fifteen years.

See also
Lehigh Valley

Notes

References

External links
Allentown at Weather.com

Allentown, Pennsylvania
Climate of Pennsylvania